Jonas Koch (born 25 June 1993 in Schwäbisch Hall) is a German cyclist, who currently rides for UCI WorldTeam . In August 2019, he was named in the startlist for the 2019 Vuelta a España. In August 2020, he was named in the startlist for the 2020 Tour de France.

For the 2021 season, Koch move to  team who brought the license of his previous team.

Major results
2015
 Tour de l'Avenir
1st  Points classification
1st Stage 1
 5th Coppa dei Laghi-Trofeo Almar
2016
 4th Overall Tour des Fjords
2017
 9th Trofeo Playa de Palma
2018
 8th Overall Tour of Norway
 9th London–Surrey Classic
 10th Handzame Classic
 10th Brussels Cycling Classic
 10th Coppa Bernocchi
2019
 1st  Points classification Tour of Austria
 7th Tour de l'Eurométropole
 7th Halle–Ingooigem
2020
 1st  Mountains classification Tour de la Provence
2021
 2nd Road race, National Road Championships
 10th Overall Deutschland Tour
2022
 4th Vuelta a Murcia

Grand Tour general classification results timeline

References

External links

1993 births
Living people
German male cyclists
People from Schwäbisch Hall
Sportspeople from Stuttgart (region)
Cyclists from Baden-Württemberg